Grapefruit is the second studio album by English musician Kiran Leonard. It was released in March 2016 under Moshi Moshi Records.

Track listing

Accolades

References

2016 albums